Jesse Jackson Millsaps (March 26, 1827 - January 9, 1900) was an officer in the Union Army during the American Civil War, a farmer, and a state legislator who served in the Arkansas House of Representatives representing Van Buren County, Arkansas in 1868 and 1885.

Millsaps was a member of the 1868 Arkansas Constitutional Convention, where he was listed as a 41 year old farmer who had been in Arkansas for eight years.

He was also a member of the 1868 General Assembly where he was a representative for the 4th district.

In 1873 he was justice of the peace in Van Buren County.

He and other 1885 House representatives and officers were included in a composite photograph, where according to the captioning he was 57 and had been in Arkansas for 24 years, originally from North Carolina, was a Methodist, his post office was in Copeland, Arkansas, and he was a Republican.

References

External links
Findagrave entry

American justices of the peace
Republican Party members of the Arkansas House of Representatives
People from North Carolina
People from Van Buren County, Arkansas
1827 births
1900 deaths
19th-century American politicians
Union Army soldiers
People of Arkansas in the American Civil War
Methodists from Arkansas